The Australian Institute of Professional Intelligence Officers (AIPIO for short) is a not-for-profit organisation which aims to promote the intelligence profession in Australia.  It was incorporated in 1990.

Membership is limited to persons who are linked to intelligence practice and/or training, and about 40% of members come from Australia's Law Enforcement community and/or government employment.  The Institute has a number of objectives, including the development of the profession through training, exchange of ideas and concepts relating to the field of intelligence.

AIPIO was co-founded by Mr Don McDowell from the Australian Attorney-General's Department and Inspector Glenn Jones from the Australian Bureau of Criminal Intelligence/NSW Police Force.

The inaugural AIPIO Management Committee comprised the following individuals:

Don McDowell - President;
Jack L'Epagniol - Vice President and Journal Editor; 
Glenn Jones - General Secretary and assistant editor;  
Jim Underwood - Treasurer; 
Joe Brain - Registrar (of members) ;

In 1991, AIPIO conducted its first annual conference, "Intel '91" which tool place at the Manly Pacific Hotel, Many, NSW.

References

External links
Official website

Intelligence Officers
Non-profit organisations based in Australia